The Sutlej is a river in northern India and Pakistan.

Sutlej may refer to the following subjects:

Geography
Satluj Valley in the Kinnaur district of Himachal Pradesh, India through which the Sutlej river runs

The Shek Sheung River in Hong Kong's New Territories is also known as the Sutlej River
The Sutlej Channel, a waterway in British Columbia, Canada
The Sutlej Yamuna link canal, a proposed freight canal connecting the Sutlej and Yamuna rivers

History
The Cis-Sutlej states, a British protectorate established in 1809, and merged in to the Punjab Province of British India in 1862
The First Anglo-Sikh War, which occurred during 1845 and 1846, is sometimes referred to as the Sutlej Campaign
The Sutlej Medal, awarded to British soldiers involved in the war

People
Hugh Sutlej Gough, a British military officer born in 1849 and died in 1920

Ships
, a sail frigate of the Royal Navy launched in 1855 and broken up in 1869
, an armoured cruiser of the Royal Navy launched in 1899 and scrapped in 1924
,  a sloop of the Royal Indian Navy (and later, the Indian Navy) launched in 1940 and sold for scrap in 1979
, a freighter built in 1940 and torpedoed in 1944
, a freighter built in 1907 and used to transport indentured Indian labourers to British colonies